Álvaro Arnaldo Craveiro was the Angolan finance minister in the government of Jose Eduardo dos Santos from March 1994 to May 1995.

References

Living people
Year of birth missing (living people)
Finance ministers of Angola
Angolan politicians
MPLA politicians
Place of birth missing (living people)